Rich & Shameless is a non-fiction TV series airing on TNT. The first season, with seven episodes, aired in 2022.

References

External links 

2022 American television series debuts
American non-fiction television series
TNT (American TV network) original programming